Santoshi Maa - Sunayein Vrat Kathayein (Mother Santoshi- Tells the story of fast) is a sequel series of the show  Santoshi Maa and is a 2020 Indian Hindi language socio-mythological television series, which premiered on 28 January 2020 on &TV and also on ZEE5 even before TV telecast. The series is produced by Rashmi Sharma and Pawan Kumar Marut under Rashmi Sharma Telefilms. The show ended on 9 August 2021. The show had its rerun on its sister channels since 10 October 2021 at 9:30 pm on Big Magic and it is all set to rerun on Zee Anmol from 14 March 2022 at 5 pm.

Plot
Swati, a devotee of Santoshi Maa marries Inder against his family wishes. At first Inder loved her a lot but afterwards a girl named Nidhi entered his life. Then he decided to get divorce from Swati. But as Swati loved him, she refuses to give divorce to him.Afterwards, his family who already dont like Swati, with him tortured her a lot. they humiliated her by putting itching powder in her saree in presence of guest. Later, she was killed by goddess Poulomi's demons engraging Mata Santoshi. Due to Mata Santoshi's anger goddess Ushma was created.

Cast

Main
 Gracy Singh as Santoshi Mata – Goddess of Contentment, she is venerated as "the Mother of Satisfaction" , Lord Ganesha and Riddhi Siddhi Daughter. (2020–2021)
 Ashish Kadian as Indresh Singh – Svati's husband, Singhasan Singh's son, Kunti Devi's son, Rinki Singh's brother, Abhay Singh's brother, Loveley Singh's brother-in-in-law, Devesh Tripati's brother-in-law (2020–2021)
 Tanvi Dogra as Svati Mishra Singh – Indresh's wife, Santoshi Mata's devotee (2020–2021)

Recurring

PrithviLok
Dharti Bhatt as Dr. Nidhi Shah – Indresh's lover (2020)
Jaya Ojha as Archana Mishra – Svati's mother, Rameshvar's wife (2020)
Prithvi Sankhala as Rameshwar Mishra – Svati's father, Archana's husband (2020)
Purva Parag as Kunti Singh – Singhasan's wife, Indresh's and Abhay's mother, Svati's mother-in-law (2020–2021)
Sushil Sinha as Singhasan Singh – Indresh's father, Kunti's husband, Svati's father-in-law (2020–2021)
Anjita Poonia as Sameeksha or Sammy – DC's daughter (2021)
Mehul Nisar as Dheeraj Chaddha or DC – Sameeksha's father (2021)
Moni Rai as Avadhesh Singh – Singhasan's younger brother (2020–2021)
Anjali Gupta as Anju Singh – Avadhesh's wife (2020–2021)
Micckie Dudaaney as Abhay Singh – Singhasan's elder son (2020–2021)
Ruchi Singh as Lovely Singh – Abhay's wife (2020–2021)
Priya Verma as Rinki – Singhasan's daughter (2020–2021)
Rajesh Puri as Manbahadur Shah – Nidhi's father (2020)
Dhiraj Rai as Devesh Tripathi – Rinki's husband (2020–2021)
Yash Chaudhari as Anuj Mishra – Svati's brother (2020)
Ankita Khare as Manju – Devesh's sister-in-law (2020–2021)
Meenu Sharma as Lacchi Devi – Devesh's mother (2020–2021)
Ridheema Tiwari as Laila (2021)
 Munendra Singh Kushwah as Inspector Ramesh (2021)
 Annapurna Vitthal as Lata - Babli's Mother (2020-21)
 Tanvi Dogra as Babli – Svati's look-alike, Indresh's fake wife, Paulomi's helper (2020)

DevLok
 Sara Khan as Devi Paulomi – Santoshi Mata's foe, Goddess of Jealousy, Also known as Asur Rani (Asur Puloman's daughter) Paulomaja or Indrani or Sachi (2020–2021)
Ratan Rajput as Devi Ushma /Santoshi – Santoshi Mata's devotee, Svati's helper (2020)
Dinesh Mehta as Mahadev (2020–2021)
Preetika Chauhan as Goddess Parvati (2020) 
Jiya Chauhan as Goddess Parvati (2020)
Garima Parihar as Goddess Parvati (2020)
Deepika Upadhyay as Goddess Parvati (2020–2021)
Sandeep Rajora as Raja Himaavan  (2020)
Himanshu Bamzai as Suryadev (2020)
Vijay Badlani as Devrishi Narad (2020–2021)
Gagan Malik as Narayan/ Krishna /Ram (2020-2021)
Saraswati Vijay/ Shalini Vishnudev as Devi Lakshmi (2021)
Shalini Singh/Neha Narang as Devi Saraswati (2021)
Owais Malik as Lord Ganesha (2021)
Ahraz Khan as Devraj Indra (2020-2021)
Rahul Sharma as Devraj Indra (2020-2021)
 Mohit Tiwari as Lord Ganesha [2021]
 Surabhi Tiwari as Mahishi (2021)
 Seema Mishra as Paulomi – Santoshi Mata's foe (2020)

References

External links 
Santoshi Maa - Sunayein Vrat Kathayein at Zee5

2019 Indian television series debuts
Hindi-language television shows
Indian television series about Hindu deities
Indian television soap operas
&TV original programming